In Christianity, worship is the act of attributing reverent honour and homage to God. In the New Testament, various words are used to refer to the term worship.

Throughout most of Christianity's history, corporate Christian worship has been liturgical, characterized by prayers and hymns, with texts rooted in, or closely related to, the Bible (Scripture), particularly the Psalter, and centered on the altar (or table) and the Eucharist; this form of sacramental and ceremonial worship is still practiced by the Catholic, Eastern Orthodox, Lutheran and Anglican churches, and Methodism to a lesser extent. In the Charismatic tradition worship is viewed as an act of adoration of God, with a more informal conception. Among certain Christian denominations, such as those of traditional Anabaptism, the observance of various ordinances rooted in Scripture occurs during Christian worship, such as feetwashing, anointing with oil, and the wearing of headcoverings by women.

The term liturgy is derived from the Greek leitourgia meaning "public service" and is formed by two words: "laos" (people) and "ergon" (work), literally "work of the people". Responsorial prayers are a series of petitions read or sung by a leader with responses made by the congregation. Set times for prayer during the day were established (based substantially on Jewish models), and a festal cycle throughout the Church year governed the celebration of feasts and holy days pertaining to the events in the life of Jesus, the lives of the saints, and aspects of the Godhead.

A great deal of emphasis was placed on the forms of worship, as they were seen in terms of the Latin phrase lex orandi, lex credendi ("the rule of prayer is the rule of belief")—that is, the specifics of one's worship express, teach, and govern the doctrinal beliefs of the community.  According to this view, alterations in the patterns and content of worship would necessarily reflect a change in the faith itself.  Each time a heresy arose in the Church, it was typically accompanied by a shift in worship for the heretical group. Orthodoxy in faith also meant orthodoxy in worship, and vice versa.  Thus, unity in Christian worship was understood to be a fulfillment of Jesus' words that the time was at hand when true worshipers would worship "in spirit and in truth" (John 4:23).

Early Church Fathers
The theme of worship is taken up by many of the Church Fathers including Justin Martyr, Irenaeus and Hippolytus of Rome (c. 170-c. 236). The Holy Eucharist was the central act of worship in early Christianity. The liturgy of the synagogues and the ritual of the Jewish temple, both of which were participated in by early Christians, helped shape the form of the early Christian liturgy, which was a dual liturgy of the word and of the Eucharist; this early structure of the liturgy still exists in the Catholic Mass and Eastern Divine Liturgy. The early Christian use of incense in worship seemed first to originate in Christian funeral rites, and was later used during regular worship services. Incense was also used in the Bible to worship God and symbolize prayer, in both the Old Testament and New Testament; one of the three Magi offered Christ frankincense, and in the Book of Revelation, angels and saints appear in Heaven offering incense to God, thus setting a precedent for Christian use of incense in worship.

Reformation liturgies

Worship as singing underwent great changes for some Christians within the Protestant Reformation. Martin Luther, a music lover, composed hymns that are still sung today, and expected congregations to be active participants in the service, singing along.

John Calvin, in Geneva, argued that while instrumental music had its time with the Levites of the Old Testament, it was no longer a proper expression for the church.  This was expanded upon by John Knox (see Presbyterian worship); only Psalms were sung, and they were sung a cappella. Furthermore, in the Genevan and Scottish Reformed tradition, man-made hymns are not sung, being seen inferior to the God-inspired psalms of the Bible. The Calvinist Regulative Principle of Worship distinguishes traditional Presbyterian and Reformed churches from the Lutheran or other Protestant churches.

Present day

Current Christian worship practices are diverse in modern Christianity, with a range of customs and theological views. Three broad groupings can be identified, and whilst some elements are universal, style and content varies greatly due to the history and differing emphases of the various branches of Christianity.

In many Christian traditions, regular public worship is complemented by worship in private and small groups, such as meditation, prayer and study.  Singing often forms an important part of Christian worship.

Common elements
While differing considerably in form, the following items characterise the worship of virtually all Christian churches.
 Meeting on Sunday (Sabbath in Christianity; Sabbath in seventh-day churches is an exception)
 Bible reading
 Communion or the Eucharist
 Music, either choral or congregational, either with or without instrumental accompaniment
 Prayer
 Teaching in the form of a sermon or homily
 A collection or offering

Sacramental tradition

This grouping can also be referred to as the Eucharistic or Catholic tradition, but note that it is not limited to the Catholic Church, but also includes the Oriental Orthodox churches, the Eastern Orthodox churches, the Lutheran churches, and most branches of the Anglican Communion. Worship (variously known as the Mass, Divine Liturgy, Divine Service, Eucharist, or Communion) is formal and centres on the offering of thanks and praise for the death and resurrection of Christ over the people's offerings of bread and wine, breaking the bread, and the receiving of the Eucharist, seen as the body and blood of Jesus Christ. Churches in this group understand worship as a mystic participation in the death and resurrection of Christ, through which they are united with him and with each other. Services are structured according to a liturgy and typically include other elements such as prayers, psalms, hymns, choral music (including polyphonic chant, plainchant, and hymnody) the reading of Scripture, and some form of teaching or homily. In the theology of the Catholic Church, the Mass takes on another dimension, that of a sacrifice which involves a ritualistic re-presentation of the Body and Blood of Christ to God the Father. The liturgy, normally led by a priest who wears vestments (a form of sacred clothing), includes the ritual usage of sacred liturgical vessels, incense, candles, and holy water, and includes ritual acts of bowing, prostration, kneeling, kissing sacred images and relics, and crossing oneself. In the Catholic Church there is a diversity of ancient liturgical rites: the Roman Rite (including both the Tridentine Mass and the ordinary-form Roman Rite) the Byzantine Rite, the Ge'ez Rite, and the Antiochene Rite to name several of the more prominent examples.

Within the Catholic Church, the charismatic movement has had much less influence, although modern Christian hymnody is found in some parishes, owing a large part to a movement known as the Catholic Charismatic Renewal.
Worship practices in the Eastern Churches have largely remained traditional.

Reformation tradition

In many Protestant groups, such as the Methodist and Reformed churches and some parts of the Anglican Communion, corporate worship is shaped by the legacy of the Reformation. Worship in such a context also generally features spoken prayer (either unscripted or prepared), Scripture readings, congregational singing of hymns, and a sermon. Some liturgy is normally used but may not be described as such. The Lord's Supper, or Communion, is celebrated less frequently (intervals vary from once a week to annually according to the denomination or local church). Vestments are less elaborate or absent.

Charismatic tradition

In Charismatic Christianity (including pentecostalism, the charismatic movement, neo-charismatic movement and certain parts of nondenominational Christianity), worship is viewed like an act of adoration of God, with a more informal conception.  Some gatherings take place in auditoriums with few religious signs. There is no dress style.
Since the beginning of charismatic movement of the 1960s there have been significant changes to Christian worship practices of many denominations. A new music-centered approach to worship, known as contemporary worship, is now commonplace. This replaces the traditional order of worship based around liturgy or a "hymn-prayer sandwich" with extended periods of congregational singing sometimes referred to as "block worship". The worship has two parts; one in the beginning with music and the second part with sermon and Lord's Supper.

In the 1980s and 1990s, Contemporary worship music settled in many evangelical churches. This music is written in the style of popular music, christian rock or folk music and therefore differs considerably from traditional hymns. It is frequently played on a range of instruments that would not have previously been used in churches such as guitars (including electric) and drum kits.

Types of Christian worship

Regular Sunday services are a part of most traditions. The Eucharist may be celebrated at some or all of these; often it is included either once a month or once a quarter. A few denominations have their main weekly services on Saturday rather than Sunday. Larger churches often tend to have several services each Sunday; often two or three in the morning and one or two in the late afternoon or evening.

Sacraments, ordinances, holy mysteries

Common to almost all
Baptism
Eucharist, Communion, Lord's Supper
Sacraments/Holy Mysteries Common to the East and to Roman Catholicism
Chrismation (Eastern) / Confirmation (Western)
Marriage
Ordination
Confession
Anointing of the Sick (Unction)
Lutherans see baptism, the Eucharist, and (for some) confession and absolution as sacraments. They recognize marriage, confirmation, ordination, and the anointing of the sick as useful church rites that do not forgive sins and therefore are not sacraments in the strict sense.

See also

 Alternative worship
 Church service
 Contemporary worship
 Devotional literature
 Magnificat
 Service of worship
 Theological aesthetics

References

Notes

Bibliography
Lang, Bernhard (1997), Sacred Games: A History of Christian Worship, New Haven: Yale University Press, 
Stevens, James H. S. (2002), Worship In The Spirit - Charismatic Worship In The Church of England, Paternoster, .
Ward, Pete (2005), Selling Worship - How What We Sing Has Changed The Church, Paternoster, 
Warner, Rob (2007), Reinventing English Evangelicalism 1966-2001 - A Theological And Sociological Study, Paternoster, . Chapter 2 includes a study of changing worship styles.
Lupia, John N., (1995) "Censer," The New Grove's Dictionary of Art (Macmillan Publishers, London)

 
Worship

de:Lobpreis und Anbetung